Ziosk is a table ordering tablet for casual dining restaurants developed by Dallas based TableTop Media. The device consists of a 7-inch tablet running Android and a credit card reader. Certain models also include a receipt printer and near field communication (NFC). As of July 2016, there are 170,000 Ziosk tablets at restaurants in the United States, including Chili's, Friendly's, Olive Garden, Red Robin, and Outback Steakhouse franchisee Cerca Trova. The company employs around 110 active employees.

The tablets also allow users to play games for a fee. TableTop Media rents the devices to restaurant operators through a subscription fee and revenue-share on paid games.

History 
In September 2013, Ziosk announced the deployment of tablets to all company-owned Chili's restaurants, to be completed by the first half of 2014.

Ziosk announced the deployment of tablets to Olive Garden in April, 2015 after customer and restaurant testing in 2014. Olive Garden expected to deploy tablets to all of its 800-plus restaurants by the end of 2015. After the deal is complete, the company estimated Ziosk tablets will be used by more than fifty million users per month.

Software and hardware 
Ziosk implements an over-the-air (OTA) update mechanism of the product platform as well as security and encryption key management for credit card payments and implementing drivers for the magnetic stripe reader hardware. Ziosk hardware is fully compliant with Payment Card Industry Payment Application Data Security Standards (PCI PA-DSS) 1.1 and Payment Application Best Practices (PABP) 1.4 standards.

In 2017, Ziosk introduced its second generation tablet, the Ziosk Aurizon.  This tablet features a single slot that can read either magstripe or EMV credit and debit cards, support for contactless payments, and a PIN pad for cards requiring a PIN.  For existing Ziosk tablets in the field, Ziosk also introduced the Smart Battery, which adds EMV and contactless capability to existing Ziosk tablets.

Privacy concerns 
Some users of Ziosk tablets have questioned the use of cameras on tabletop ordering tablets, citing privacy concerns. Ziosk responded to the concerns stating that the company does not save or share information from the camera without permission from the user. They also noted that a green light near the top of the device will be activated when the camera is active, and that the camera is used specifically to read coupons.

References

External links
 

Tablet computers
Android (operating system) devices